Pavilhão Multiusos de Coimbra is a multipurpose sports arena in Coimbra, Portugal adjacent to the Estádio Cidade de Coimbra stadium and the municipal swimming pools (Piscinas Municipais). Built in 2003, it is venue for Académica de Coimbra basketball team, among other teams and events. Its owner is Coimbra's City Hall and it has 2,239 seats.

References

Buildings and structures in Coimbra
Sport in Coimbra
Indoor arenas in Portugal
Sports venues in Coimbra District
Basketball venues in Portugal
2003 establishments in Portugal
Sports venues completed in 2003